Linda macilenta is a species of beetle in the family Cerambycidae. It was described by Gressitt in 1947. It is known from China.

References

macilenta
Beetles described in 1947